The following is a list of notable Da'is, that is, Muslim preachers who invite people to Islam.

 Abdur Raheem Green
Abu Ammar Yasir Qadhi
 Abul Hasan Ali Hasani Nadwi
 Abu-Abdullah Adelabu
 Ahmad Dahlan
 Ahmed Deedat
 Amr Khaled
 Arif Hussain al Hussaini
 Azizul Haque
 Bachtiar Nasir
 Bilal Philips
 Delwar Hossain Sayeedi
 Hamza Tzortzis
Hamza Yusuf
 Hussein Ye
 Inamul Hasan Kandhlawi
 Ismail ibn Musa Menk
 Israr Ahmed
 Jalaluddin Umri
 Jamal Badawi
 Khalid Yasin
 M. M. Akbar
 Muhammad Abdul Wahhab
Muhammad Asadullah Al-Ghalib
 Muhammad Saad Kandhlawi
 Mohammad Natsir
 Nouman Ali Khan
Omar Suleiman
 Saeed Abubakr Zakaria
 Saniyasnain Khan
 Shamsi Ali
 Siraj Wahaj
 Suhaib Webb
 Tareq Al-Suwaidan
 Tariq Jameel
 Wahiduddin Khan
 Yusuf Estes
 Zakir Naik

See also 
Dawah
Islam
Muslim scholars
List of modern-day Muslim scholars of Islam

References 

 
Dais
Dais